North Wabash Historic District is a national historic district located at Wabash, Wabash County, Indiana. It encompasses 159 contributing buildings in a predominantly residential section of Wabash.  It developed between about 1846 and 1949, and includes representative examples of Italianate, Queen Anne, Colonial Revival, and Bungalow / American Craftsman style architecture.  Located in the district is the separately listed McNamee-Ford House.  Other notable buildings include the John Wilson House (c. 1870), Milliner House (1890), Thomas McNamee House (c. 1900), Williams House (c. 1900), Eagle House (c. 1870), and David Kunse House (1846).

It was listed on the National Register of Historic Places in 1999.

References

Historic districts on the National Register of Historic Places in Indiana
Italianate architecture in Indiana
Queen Anne architecture in Indiana
Colonial Revival architecture in Indiana
Bungalow architecture in Indiana
Historic districts in Wabash, Indiana
National Register of Historic Places in Wabash County, Indiana